The 39th Annual Grammy Awards were held on February 26, 1997, at Madison Square Garden, New York City. They recognized accomplishments by musicians from the previous year. Babyface was the night's biggest winner, with 3 awards. Celine Dion, Toni Braxton, Sheryl Crow, and The Fugees won two awards. Celine Dion for "Best Pop Album" and "Album of the Year" and Toni Braxton for "Best Female R&B Vocal Performance" and "Best Female Pop Vocal Performance". The show was hosted by Ellen Degeneres who also performed the opening with Shawn Colvin, Bonnie Rait, and Chaka Khan.

Performers
 Chaka Khan, Bonnie Raitt, Sheila E., Shawn Colvin & Ellen DeGeneres - Opening
 Smashing Pumpkins – 1979
 Natalie Cole with Wayne Shorter & Herbie Hancock – A Tribute to Ella Fitzgerald : (If You Can't Sing It) You'll Have to Swing It (Mr. Paganini) 
 Bruce Springsteen – The Ghost of Tom Joad
 Celine Dion with David Foster – All By Myself
 Beck – Where It's At
 No Doubt – Spiderwebs
 Tracy Chapman – Give Me One Reason
 The Fugees – No Woman, No Cry
 Vince Gill with Alison Krauss and Union Station - High Lonesome Sound
 Patty Loveless - A Thousand Times a Day
 Vince Gill, Patty Loveless with Alison Krauss and Union Station - Working on a Building 
 Brandy - Sittin' Up in My Room
 Mary J. Blige - Not Gon' Cry
 Whitney Houston - Exhale (Shoop Shoop)
 Whitney Houston with CeCe Winans, Brandy, Mary J. Blige, Chaka Khan & Aretha Franklin – Count On Me
 Eric Clapton & Babyface – Change The World
 Riverdance: Music from the Show
 Gil Shaham with Charles Dutoit - Prokofiev: Violin Concerto No. 1 In D Major, Op. 19 - 2. Scherzo. Vivacissimo

Presenters
 Maxwell & Toni Braxton – Best Rap Album
 LeAnn Rimes & Clint Black – Best Country Album
 Kevin Bacon, Fiona Apple & Dwight Yoakam – Best Male Rock Vocal Performance
 Elvis Costello & Burt Bacharach – Best Female Rock Vocal Performance 
 Kevin Spacey & Jewel – Best Hard Rock Performance
 Deana Carter, Shawn Colvin & Trisha Yearwood – Best Contemporary Folk Album
 Enrique Iglesias, Tyra Banks & LL Cool J – Best Female Pop Vocal Performance
 Seal & Bonnie Raitt – Best Male Pop Vocal Performance 
 Quincy Jones & Liza Minnelli – Best Musical Show Album
 Jessye Norman - Best Instrumental Soloist(s) Performance (with Orchestra)
 Jakob Dylan, Sheryl Crow & Steve Winwood – Best New Artist
 Tony Rich Project & Gloria Estefan – Song of the Year 
 Tony Bennett, Aretha Franklin & Stevie Wonder – Record of the Year
 Sting & Diana Ross – Album of the Year

Award winners

General
Record of the Year
 "Change the World" – Eric Clapton
 Kenneth "Babyface" Edmonds, producer
 "Give Me One Reason" – Tracy Chapman
 Tracy Chapman & Don Gehman, producers
 "Because You Loved Me" – Celine Dion
 David Foster, producer
 "Ironic" – Alanis Morissette
 Glen Ballard, producer
 "1979" – The Smashing Pumpkins
 Billy Corgan, Flood and Alan Moulder, producers

Album of the Year
 Falling Into You – Celine Dion
 Roy Bittan, Jeff Bova, David Foster, Humberto Gatica, Jean-Jacques Goldman, Rick Hahn, Dan Hill, John Jones, Aldo Nova, Rick Nowels, Steven Rinkoff, Billy Steinberg, Jim Steinman and Ric Wake, producers
 Odelay – Beck
 Beck Hansen and The Dust Brothers, producers
 The Score – Fugees
 Diamond D, Jerry "Te Bass" Duplessis, John Forté, Lauryn Hill, Shawn King, Prakazrel "Pras", Salaam Remi, Handel Tucker and Wyclef, producers
 Mellon Collie and the Infinite Sadness – The Smashing Pumpkins
 Billy Corgan, Flood and Alan Moulder, producers
 Waiting to Exhale Soundtrack – various artists 
 Babyface, producer

Song of the Year
 "Change the World"
 Gordon Kennedy, Wayne Kirkpatrick & Tommy Sims, songwriters (Eric Clapton)
 "Because You Loved Me"
 Diane Warren, songwriter (Celine Dion)
 "Blue"
 Bill Mack, songwriter (LeAnn Rimes)
 "Exhale (Shoop Shoop)"
 Kenneth "Babyface" Edmonds, songwriter (Whitney Houston)
 "Give Me One Reason"
 Tracy Chapman, songwriter (Tracy Chapman)

Best New Artist
 LeAnn Rimes
 Garbage
 Jewel
 No Doubt
 The Tony Rich Project

Pop
Best Female Pop Vocal Performance
 "Un-Break My Heart" – Toni Braxton
 "Get Out of This House" – Shawn Colvin
 "Because You Loved Me" – Celine Dion
 "Reach" – Gloria Estefan
 "Who Will Save Your Soul" - Jewel

Best Male Pop Vocal Performance
 "Change the World" – Eric Clapton
 "Let's Make a Night to Remember" – Bryan Adams
 "Key West Intermezzo (I Saw You First)" – John Mellencamp
 "Nobody Knows" – The Tony Rich Project
 "Let Your Soul Be Your Pilot" – Sting

Best Pop Performance by a Duo or Group with Vocal
 "Free as a Bird" – The Beatles
 "As Long as It Matters" – Gin Blossoms
 "When You Love a Woman" – Journey
 "Fire on the Mountain" – The Neville Brothers
 "Peaches" – The Presidents of the United States of America
 "When You Wish Upon a Star" – Take 6

Best Pop Collaboration with Vocals
 "When I Fall in Love" – Natalie Cole with Nat King Cole
 "God Give Me Strength" – Burt Bacharach and Elvis Costello
 "Missing You" – Brandy, Tamia, Gladys Knight and Chaka Khan
 "Count on Me" – Whitney Houston and CeCe Winans
 "My Way" – Frank Sinatra and Luciano Pavarotti
 "The Wind Cries Mary" – Sting, John McLaughlin, Dominic Miller and Vinnie Colaiuta

Best Pop Instrumental Performance
 "The Sinister Minister" – Béla Fleck and the Flecktones
 "Theme from Mission: Impossible" – Adam Clayton and Larry Mullen Jr.
 "Mission: Impossible" – Lalo Schifrin with London Philharmonic Orchestra
 "Mellon Collie and the Infinite Sadness" – The Smashing Pumpkins
 "Kiss Lonely Goodbye (Harmonica with Orchestra)" – Stevie Wonder

Best Pop Album
 Falling into You – Celine Dion
 Secrets – Toni Braxton
 Babyface, producer
 New Beginning – Tracy Chapman
 Tracy Chapman and Don Gehman, producers
 A Few Small Repairs – Shawn Colvin
 John Leventhal, producer
 Mercury Falling – Sting
 Hugh Padgham and Sting, producers

Traditional Pop
Best Traditional Pop Vocal Performance
 Here's to the Ladies – Tony Bennett
 Dedicated to Nelson – Rosemary Clooney
 Stardust – Natalie Cole
 Gently – Liza Minnelli
 I'll Be Your Baby Tonight – Bernadette Peters

Rock
Best Female Rock Vocal Performance
 "If It Makes You Happy" – Sheryl Crow
 "Mother Mother" – Tracy Bonham
 "Give Me One Reason" – Tracy Chapman
 "Spider Web" – Joan Osborne
 "Burning Down the House" – Bonnie Raitt

Best Male Rock Vocal Performance
 "Where It's At" – Beck
 "The Only Thing That Looks Good on Me Is You" – Bryan Adams
 "Ain't Gone 'n' Give Up on Love" – Eric Clapton
 "Cry Love" – John Hiatt
 "Dead Man Walkin'" – Bruce Springsteen

Best Rock Performance by a Duo or Group with Vocal
 "So Much to Say" – Dave Matthews Band
 "Stupid Girl" – Garbage
 "Wonderwall" – Oasis
 "1979" – The Smashing Pumpkins
 "6th Avenue Heartache" – The Wallflowers

Best Hard Rock Performance
 "Bullet with Butterfly Wings" – The Smashing Pumpkins
 "Again" – Alice in Chains
 "Bulls on Parade" – Rage Against the Machine
 "Pretty Noose" – Soundgarden
 "Trippin' on a Hole in a Paper Heart" – Stone Temple Pilots

Best Metal Performance
 "Tire Me" – Rage Against the Machine
 "Shoots and Ladders" – Korn
 "Suicide Note Pt. 1" – Pantera
 "I'm Your Boogie Man" – White Zombie
 "Hands of Death (Burn Baby Burn)" – Rob Zombie and Alice Cooper

Best Rock Instrumental Performance
 "SRV Shuffle" – Eric Clapton, Robert Cray, Buddy Guy, Dr. John, B.B. King, Art Neville, Bonnie Raitt and Jimmie Vaughan
 "Green Onions" – Booker T. & the M.G.'s
 "Pavilion" – Eric Johnson
 "(You're) My World" – Joe Satriani
 "Respect the Wind" – Edward and Alex Van Halen

Best Rock Song
 "Give Me One Reason"
 Tracy Chapman, songwriter (Tracy Chapman)
 "Cry Love"
 John Hiatt, songwriter (John Hiatt)
 "6th Avenue Heartache"
 Jakob Dylan, songwriter (The Wallflowers)
 "Stupid Girl"
 Garbage, songwriters (Garbage)
 "Too Much"
 Dave Matthews Band, songwriters (Dave Matthews Band)
 "Wonderwall"
 Noel Gallagher, songwriter (Oasis)

Best Rock Album
 Sheryl Crow – Sheryl Crow
 Sheryl Crow, producer
 Crash – Dave Matthews Band
 Steve Lillywhite, producer
 Tragic Kingdom – No Doubt
 Matthew Wilder, producer
 Road Tested – Bonnie Raitt
 Bonnie Raitt and Don Was, producers
 Broken Arrow – Neil Young with Crazy Horse
 Neil Young, producer

Alternative
Best Alternative Music Performance
 Odelay – Beck
 Boys for Pele – Tori Amos
 The Burdens of Being Upright – Tracy Bonham
 New Adventures in Hi-Fi – R.E.M.
 Mellon Collie and the Infinite Sadness – The Smashing Pumpkins

R&B
Best Female R&B Vocal Performance
 "You're Makin' Me High" – Toni Braxton
 "Not Gon' Cry" – Mary J. Blige
 "Sittin' Up in My Room" – Brandy
 "Exhale (Shoop Shoop)" – Whitney Houston
 "You Put a Move on My Heart" – Tamia

Best Male R&B Vocal Performance
 "Your Secret Love" – Luther Vandross
 "Lady" – D'Angelo
 "A Change Is Gonna Come" – Al Green
 "New World Order" – Curtis Mayfield
 "Like a Woman" – The Tony Rich Project

Best R&B Performance by a Duo or Group with Vocal
 "Killing Me Softly" – Fugees
 "Slow Jams" – Babyface and Tamia with Portrait and Barry White
 "Stomp" – Luke Cresswell, Fiona Wilkes, Carl Smith, Fraser Morrison, Everett Bradley, Mr. X, Melle Mel, Coolio, Yo-Yo, Chaka Khan, Charlie Wilson, Shaquille O'Neal and Luniz
 "Don't Let Go (Love)" – En Vogue
 "Never Miss the Water" – Chaka Khan featuring Meshell Ndegeocello

Best R&B Song
 "Exhale (Shoop Shoop)"
 Babyface, songwriter (Whitney Houston)
 "Sittin' Up in My Room"
 Babyface, songwriter (Brandy)
 "You Put a Move on My Heart"
 Rod Temperton, songwriter (Tamia)
 "Your Secret Love"
 Luther Vandross and Reed Vertelney (Luther Vandross)
 "You're Makin' Me High"
 Babyface, Toni Braxton and Bryce Wilson, songwriters (Toni Braxton)

Best R&B Album
 Words – The Tony Rich Project
 Tony Rich, producer
 Moving On – Oleta Adams
 Michael J. Powell, producer
 Maxwell's Urban Hang Suite – Maxwell
 Musze, producer
 New World Order – Curtis Mayfield
 Peace Beyond Passion – Meshell Ndegeocello
 David Gamson, producer

Blues
Best Traditional Blues Album
James Cotton for Deep in the Blues

Best Contemporary Blues Album
Keb' Mo' for Just Like You

Children's
Best Musical Album for Children
George Massenburg (producer) & Linda Ronstadt (producer & artist) for Dedicated to the One I Love

Best Spoken Word Album for Children
Virginia Callaway, Steven Heller (producers) & David Holt (producer & narrator) for Stellaluna

Comedy
From 1994 through 2003, see "Best Spoken Comedy Album" under the "Spoken" field, below.

Classical
Best Orchestral Performance
Michael Tilson Thomas (conductor) & the San Francisco Symphony for Prokofiev: Romeo and Juliet (Scenes From the Ballet)
Best Classical Vocal Performance
James Levine (conductor), Bryn Terfel & the Metropolitan Opera Orchestra for Opera Arias - Works of Mozart, Wagner, Borodin
Best Opera Recording
Brian Couzens (producer), Richard Hickox (conductor), Philip Langridge, Alan Opie, Janice Watson, the London Symphony Chorus & the City of London Sinfonia for Britten: Peter Grimes 
Best Choral Performance
Andrew Litton (conductor), Neville Creed, David Hill (chorus masters) & the Bournemouth Symphony Orchestra & Chorus for Walton: Belshazzar's Feast
Best Instrumental Soloist(s) Performance (with orchestra)
Esa-Pekka Salonen (conductor), Yefim Bronfman & the Los Angeles Philharmonic for Bartók: The Three Piano Concertos 
Best Instrumental Soloist Performance (without orchestra)
Earl Wild for The Romantic Master - Works of Saint-Saëns, Handel
Best Small Ensemble Performance (with or without conductor)
Pierre Boulez (conductor) & the Ensemble Inter-Contemporain for Boulez: ...Explosante-Fixe... 
Best Chamber Music Performance
The Cleveland Quartet for Corigliano: String Quartet
Best Classical Contemporary Composition
John Corigliano (composer) & the Cleveland Quartet for Corigliano: String Quartet
Best Classical Album
Joanna Nickrenz (producer), Leonard Slatkin (conductor), Michelle De Young, various artists, the Washington Choral Arts Society Male Chorus, the Washington Oratorio Society Male Chorus & the National Symphony Orchestra for Corigliano: Of Rage and Remembrance

Composing and arranging
Best Instrumental Composition
Herbie Hancock & Jean Hancock (composers) for "Manhattan (Island of Lights and Love)" performed by Herbie Hancock
Best Song Written Specifically for a Motion Picture or for Television
Diane Warren (songwriter) for "Because You Loved Me" (Theme from Up Close & Personal) performed by Céline Dion
Best Instrumental Composition Written for a Motion Picture or for Television
David Arnold (composer) for Independence Day
Best Instrumental Arrangement
Michael Kamen (arranger) for "An American Symphony (Mr. Holland's Opus)"
Best Instrumental Arrangement with Accompanying Vocal(s)
Alan Broadbent & David Foster (arrangers) for "When I Fall in Love" performed by Natalie Cole with Nat King Cole

Country
Best Female Country Vocal Performance
LeAnn Rimes for "Blue"
Best Male Country Vocal Performance
Vince Gill for "Worlds Apart"
Best Country Performance by a Duo or Group with Vocal
Brooks & Dunn for "My Maria"
Best Country Collaboration with Vocals
Alison Krauss & Union Station & Vince Gill for "High Lonesome Sound"
Best Country Instrumental Performance
Chet Atkins for "Jam Man"
Best Country Song
Bill Mack (songwriter) for "Blue" performed by LeAnn Rimes
Best Country Album
Billy Williams (producer) & Lyle Lovett (producer & artist) for The Road to Ensenada
Best Bluegrass Album
Todd Phillips (producer) for True Life Blues: The Songs of Bill Monroe performed by various artists

Folk
Best Traditional Folk Album
Pete Seeger for Pete
Best Contemporary Folk Album
Bruce Springsteen for The Ghost of Tom Joad

Gospel
Best Pop/Contemporary Gospel Album
Neal Joseph & Norman Miller (producers) for Tribute - The Songs of Andraé Crouch performed by various artists
Best Rock Gospel Album
dc Talk for Jesus Freak
Best Traditional Soul Gospel Album
Cissy Houston for Face to Face
Best Contemporary Soul Gospel Album
Kirk Franklin for Whatcha Lookin' 4
Best Southern Gospel, Country Gospel or Bluegrass Gospel Album
Andy Griffith for I Love to Tell the Story - 25 Timeless Hymns
Best Gospel Album by a Choir or Chorus
Shirley Caesar (choir director) for Just a Word performed by Shirley Caesar's Outreach Convention Choir

Historical
Best Historical Album
Bob Belden (producer), Phil Schaap (producer & engineer), Mark Wilder (engineer) for Miles Davis & Gil Evans: The Complete Columbia Studio Recordings performed by Miles Davis & Gil Evans

Jazz
Best Jazz Instrumental Solo
Michael Brecker for "Cabin Fever"
Best Jazz Instrumental Performance, Individual or Group
Michael Brecker for Tales From the Hudson
Best Large Jazz Ensemble Performance
Grover Mitchell for Live at Manchester Craftsmen's Guild
Best Jazz Vocal Performance
Cassandra Wilson for New Moon Daughter
Best Contemporary Jazz Performance
Wayne Shorter for High Life
Best Latin Jazz Performance
Paquito D'Rivera for Portraits of Cuba

Latin
Best Latin Pop Performance
Enrique Iglesias for Enrique Iglesias
Best Tropical Latin Performance
Rubén Blades for La Rosa de los Vientos
Best Mexican-American/Tejano Music Performance
La Mafia for Un Millón de Rosas

Musical Show
Best Musical Show Album
Bill Whelan (composer, lyricist & producer) & various artists for Riverdance

Music video
Best Music Video, Short Form
Vincent Joliet (video producer), Joe Pytka (video director) & The Beatles for "Free as a Bird"
Best Music Video, Long Form
Chips Chipperfield, Neil Aspinall (video producers), Bob Smeaton, Geoff Wonfor (video directors) & The Beatles for The Beatles Anthology

New Age
Best New Age Album
Enya for The Memory of Trees

Packaging and Notes
Best Recording Package
Andy Engel & Tommy Steele (art directors) for Ultra-Lounge (Leopard Skin Sampler) performed by various artists
Best Recording Package - Boxed
Arnold Levine & Chika Azuma (art directors) for The Complete Columbia Studio Recordings performed by Miles Davis & Gil Evans
Best Album Notes
Bill Kirchner, Bob Belden, George Avakian & Phil Schaap (notes writers) for Miles Davis & Gil Evans: The Complete Columbia Studio Recordings performed by Miles Davis & Gil Evans

Polka
Best Polka Album
Jimmy Sturr for Polka! All Night Long

Production and engineering
Best Engineered Album, Non-Classical
Al Schmitt, Bruce Swedien, Francis Buckley & Tommy Vicari for Q's Jook Joint performed by Quincy Jones

Best Engineered Album, Classical
Lawrence Rock, William Hoekstra (engineers), Leonard Slatkin (conductor) & the Saint Louis Symphony for Copland: Dance Symphony; Short Symphony; Organ Symphony

Producer of the Year
Babyface

Classical Producer of the Year
Joanna Nickrenz

Rap
Best Rap Solo Performance
 "Hey Lover" – LL Cool J
 "1, 2, 3, 4 (Sumpin' New)" – Coolio
 "If I Ruled the World (Imagine That)" – Nas
 "Rock With You" – Heavy D
 "Woo Hah!! Got You All in Check" – Busta Rhymes
Best Rap Performance by a Duo or Group
 "Tha Crossroads" – Bone Thugs-N-Harmony
 "California Love" – 2Pac featuring Dr. Dre and Roger Troutman
 "How Do U Want It" – 2Pac featuring K-Ci & JoJo
 "1nce Again" – A Tribe Called Quest
 "Champagne" – Salt-N-Pepa

Best Rap Album
 The Score – Fugees
 All Eyez On Me – 2Pac
 Beats, Rhymes and Life – A Tribe Called Quest
 Gangsta's Paradise – Coolio
 Mr. Smith – LL Cool J

Reggae
Best Reggae Album
Bunny Wailer for Hall of Fame: A Tribute to Bob Marley's 50th Anniversary

Spoken
Best Spoken Word or Non-musical Album
Hillary Rodham Clinton for It Takes a Village
Best Spoken Comedy Album
Al Franken for Rush Limbaugh Is a Big Fat Idiot

World
Best World Music Album
The Chieftains for Santiago

Special Merit Awards

MusiCares Person of the Year

Phil Collins

References

External links
39th Grammy Awards at the Internet Movie Database

 039
1997 in New York City
1997 music awards
Madison Square Garden
1997 in American music
Grammy
February 1997 events in the United States